Kansas City School District may refer to:
Kansas City, Missouri School District
Kansas City, Kansas Public Schools